Frederick Arthur Anderson (16 March 1886 – 21 April 1963) was an Australian rules footballer who played a single game with Essendon in the Victorian Football League (VFL).

Notes

External links 
		

1886 births
1963 deaths
Australian rules footballers from Tasmania
Essendon Football Club players
Australian military personnel of World War I